Chelsea High School (CHS) is a public high school located in Chelsea, Michigan, United States.

Demographics
The demographic breakdown of the 846 students enrolled in 2018-2019 was:

 Male (431) - 50.9%
 Female (415) - 49.1%
 Native American/Alaskan (2) - 0.2%
 Asian/Pacific islanders (9) - 1%
 Black (3) - 0.45%
 Hispanic (32) - 3.8%
 White (764) - 90.3%
 Multiracial (32) - 3.8%

13.9% (118) of the students were eligible for free or reduced price lunch.

Athletics
Chelsea is a member of the Southeastern Conference and the Michigan High School Athletic Association MHSAA SEC. It is a Class B school and competes in Division 2 in all sports except for ice hockey, men's and women's swimming and diving, football, and men's and women's tennis which are Division 3.

Notable alumni
Tony Scheffler - NFL tight end
Kiana Weber - violinist, Gaelic Storm
Tesha Price - pro wrestler

References

Public high schools in Michigan
Schools in Washtenaw County, Michigan
Public middle schools in Michigan
Public elementary schools in Michigan